Krasne or Krásné may refer to:

Places

Canada
Krasne, Saskatchewan, near Quinton, Saskatchewan

Czech Republic
 Krásné (Chrudim District), a village in the Pardubice Region
 Krásné (Žďár nad Sázavou District), a village in the Vysočina Region

Poland
Krasne, Gmina Rejowiec Fabryczny in Lublin Voivodeship (east Poland)
Krasne, Gmina Wojsławice in Lublin Voivodeship (east Poland)
Krasne, Augustów County in Podlaskie Voivodeship (north-east Poland)
Krasne, Białystok County in Podlaskie Voivodeship (north-east Poland)
Krasne, Gmina Giby in Podlaskie Voivodeship (north-east Poland)
Krasne, Gmina Krasnopol in Podlaskie Voivodeship (north-east Poland)
Krasne, Lubartów County in Lublin Voivodeship (east Poland)
Krasne, Sokółka County in Podlaskie Voivodeship (north-east Poland)
Krasne, Zamość County in Lublin Voivodeship (east Poland)
Krasne, Przeworsk County in Subcarpathian Voivodeship (south-east Poland)
Krasne, Rzeszów County in Subcarpathian Voivodeship (south-east Poland)
Krasne, Masovian Voivodeship (east-central Poland)
Krasne, Człuchów County in Pomeranian Voivodeship (north Poland)
Krasne, West Pomeranian Voivodeship (north-west Poland)
Krasne Commune, Masovian Voivodeship (east-central Poland)
Krasne Commune, Subcarpathian Voivodeship (south-east Poland)

Ukraine
 Krasne, Zolochiv Raion, Lviv Oblast, an urban-type settlement in Lviv Oblast, site of Krasne longwave transmitter
 Krasne, Pokrovsk Raion, a village in Pokrovsk Raion (Donetsk Oblast)
 Krasne, Tarutyne Raion, a village in Tarutyne Raion
 Krasne, Turka Raion, a village in Turka Raion (Lviv Oblastn)

Crimea (disputed)
 Krasne Lake, part of the Syvash salt lake system

People
Nancy Krasne, American politician
Philip N. Krasne (1905-1999), American lawyer and film and TV producer

See also
 

 Krasna (disambiguation)
 Krasno (disambiguation)